Lauren Anne Landa (born June 9, 1988) is an American voice actress who has worked on English dubs for Japanese anime and video games.

Career
Landa's most known roles are Litchi Faye-Ling in the BlazBlue fighting video game series and Leia Rolando in Tales of Xillia. She also voiced Arf and Chrono in the Magical Girl Lyrical Nanoha series; Kirche in The Familiar of Zero, Kasumi since Dead or Alive 5, Kyoko Sakura in Puella Magi Madoka Magica, Nao Tomori in Charlotte, Mio Naruse in The Testament of Sister New Devil, Annie Leonhart in Attack on Titan, and Michiru Kaioh/Sailor Neptune in the Viz Media dub of Sailor Moon.

Filmography

Anime

Animation

Films

Video games

References

External links
 Official website
 
 
 

Living people
1988 births
Actresses from Los Angeles
American video game actresses
American voice actresses
People from Thousand Oaks, California
21st-century American actresses